The 2019–20 EFL League One (referred to as the Sky Bet League One for sponsorship reasons) was the 16th season of Football League One under its current title and the 28th season under its current league division format.

Newly promoted Bury were expelled from the EFL on 27 August 2019, due to financial issues at the club. They could not satisfy the requirements of their notice of withdrawal issued by the EFL for this deadline date. The league operated with 23 teams for 2019–20, with three teams being relegated to League Two for the 2020–21 season, rather than the usual four. Bury did not fulfil any of their league fixtures for the season, as they were all postponed, so no results were expunged.

Financially troubled Bolton Wanderers entered administration and had been threatened with expulsion but were saved in a buy-out on 28 August. Bolton failed to fulfil their fixture against Doncaster Rovers on 20 August. They called off the game 26 hours before kick off without informing the EFL nor Doncaster, claiming concerns over younger players' welfare. On 21 November, they were issued with a five-point deduction suspended for 18 months in relation to the Doncaster postponement, as well as a postponement in the 2018–19 season against Brentford in the Championship.

Due to the ongoing COVID-19 pandemic, the season was temporarily suspended on 13 March. On 3 April 2020, this suspension was extended indefinitely.

On 9 June, clubs voted to curtail the season, meaning the final table would be calculated by a points-per-game method with the play-offs being played behind closed doors.

Team changes
The following teams have changed division since the 2018–19 season.

Stadiums

Personnel and sponsoring

 1 According to current revision of List of current Premier League and English Football League managers.
 2 Southend's shirt does not display Paddy Power's logo as part of the bookmakers "Save Our Shirt" campaign.

Managerial changes

League table

Play-offs

Results

Season statistics

Top scorers

Hat-tricks

References

 
EFL League One seasons
2
2
Eng
England